Valu Jada Tolu Beltu is a 1992 Indian Telugu-language comedy film, produced by Gutta Madhusudana Rao under the banner M.R.C. Movie Creations and directed by Vijaya Bapineedu. It stars Rajendra Prasad and Kanaka, with music composed by Prasanna Swaraj. It is the remake of the successful 1990 Malayalam film, Nanma Niranjavan Sreenivasan, starring Jayaram and Urvashi.

Plot
The film begins at a village Accha Rao (Rajendra Prasad) an innocent craven leads a rejoicing life. He acquires a constable job, proceeds to take charge where the Station S.I. (Vallabhaneni Janardhan) is malicious. Here, their Head Constable (P. L. Narayana) endears Accha Rao's amiable nature, gives him shelter and his daughter Seeta (Kanaka) loves Accha Rao. Meanwhile, a new scheme commences in the town by a company to sell household goods at the lowest prices. The company agent Peter (Sai Kumar) collects huge amounts as advance from the public. Thereupon, the Company turns fraudulent and the Proprietor's son tries to escape with the money when Peter restricts his way. In that quarrel, accidentally, he dies in the hands of Peter when S.I. takes him into custody and tortures terribly. Just as, Accha Rao shows his solace which Peter exploits and absconds. So to protect Accha Rao, Head Constable takes the guilt. Right now, to redeem himself, Accha Rao moves to nab Peter along with Seeta. At present, the district S.P. (Kota Shankar Rao) instructs S.I. to present Accha Rao & Peter before him. Parallelly, the Company Proprietor (M. S. Gopinath) bids the S.I. to slay them out. In that process, Accha Rao meets his mother (Radha Kumari) and learns that Peter's wife (Sailaja) is terminally ill. Be concerned, Accha Rao looks after them, even finds whereabouts of Peter and unites him with his wife. Thereafter, Peter surrenders himself to Police. Simultaneously, Accha Rao goes into the clutches of the Company Proprietor. Both of them try to slaughter Accha Rao & Peter, but Accha Rao breaks out by eliminating the blackguard and rushes towards Peter. By that time, S.I. encounters Peter and tries to kill Accha Rao too. Fortuitously, the S.P. witnesses it and knocks out the S.I. Finally, Accha Rao is promoted as S.I. and the movie ends on a happy note with the marriage of Accha Rao & Seeta.

Cast

Rajendra Prasad as Accha Rao
Kanaka as Seeta
Vallabhaneni Janardhan as S.I.
M. S. Gopinath as Company Proprietor
P. L. Narayana as Head Constable
Sai Kumar as Peter
Nutan Prasad as Accha Rao's maternal uncle
Brahmanandam
Babu Mohan
Kota Shankar Rao as S.P.
Ananth as Accha Rao's friend
Chitti Babu as Accha Rao's friend
Potti Prasad
Kallu Chidambaram
Ironleg Sastri as Accha Rao's friend
Dham
Varalakshmi as Sri Mahalakshmi
Radha Kumari as Peter's mother
Annuja 
Sailaja as Peter's wife
Kalpana Rai
Nirmalamma as Accha Rao's grandmother

Crew
Art: AP Raju
Choreography: Thara, Siva Subrahmanyam, Prameela
Stills: G. Narayana Rao
Fights: Vicky
Script: M. V. V. S. Babu Rao
Dialogues: V. Ananda Shankaram 
Lyrics:  Bhuvana Chandra
Playback: S. P. Balasubrahmanyam, Chitra, Malgudi Subha
Music: Prasanna Sarraj
Editing: Trinath 
Cinematography: Babu
Producer: Gutta Madhusudana Rao
Story - Screenplay - Director: Vijaya Bapineedu
Banner: M.R.C. Movie Creations
Release date: 21 February 1992

Soundtrack

Music composed by Prasanna Swaraj. Lyrics were written by Bhuvana Chandra. Music released on Supreme Audio Company.

Other
 VCDs and DVDs on - VOLGA Videos, Hyderabad

References

External links
 

1992 films
1990s Telugu-language films
Telugu remakes of Malayalam films